Madoka is a software system for supporting the automation of business processes. Initially a stock management system it progressed into an e-commerce system and then into a system for supporting the dynamic processing of various ordering tasks that can be automated.

External links
 3B Systems Limited Madoka was initially developed here
 PKT Solutions Limited The current developers of the Madoka system

Business software